Bear Spring is an unincorporated community in Stewart County, Tennessee, in the United States.

History
A post office called Bear Spring was established in 1893, and remained in operation until it was discontinued in 1948. According to local history, the community was so named when a pioneer settler shot a bear in a nearby spring.

References

Unincorporated communities in Stewart County, Tennessee
Unincorporated communities in Tennessee